The Beatnigs is the only album by the San Francisco band The Beatnigs, released in 1988. It combined punk, industrial and hip hop influences.

Production
Michael Franti wrote all of the lyrics to the songs; he also played bass. The album was produced by the Beatnigs. An enclosure explaining the origins of the band's name was included with the album.

Critical reception
Spin wrote that the album mixed "the Last Poets’ severe rhetoric with the horrific industrial grinding of Einstürzende Neubauten." Trouser Press wrote that "this striking San Francisco quintet explodes in a tight and danceable riot of industrial percussion, vocals and tape manipulations." The New York Times called the album "a powerful conglomeration of taped sounds - speeches by Malcolm X, for instance - industrial noise made with saws, sirens and oil drums, and a conventional rhythm section." MusicHound Rock: The Essential Album Guide called it "the most interesting and innovative album any of Franti's three groups has made, loaded with sonic twists and turns." The Spin Alternative Record Guide deemed it "an angrier warm-up to De La Soul a year later: choppy beats mingled with inflammatory news items, goofy how-to spiels, exhortations from Malcolm X and others, and twisted loops of electro-industrial din."

Track listing
All songs written by The Beatnigs.

 "(Welcome) - Television"
 " C.I.A."
 "(Instructions) - When You Wake Up In The Morning"
 "(The Experience Of All Of Us) - Street Fulla Nigs"
 " (Re-Classification) - Control"
 "Malcolm X"
 "Nature"
 "Burritos"
 "Rooticus Sporaticus"
 "Who Is Doing This To All My People"
 "Rules"

CD 'bonus tracks'
 "Jazzy Beats"
 "Pre-War America"
 "Television" (Radio Edit)
 "Television" (Remix)

Personnel
The Beatnigs
 Henry Flood - congas, timbales, industrial percussion
 Andre Flores - keyboards, sampling, vocals, industrial percussion
 Michael Franti - vocals, bass, tape edits, industrial percussion
 Kevin Carnes- vocals, tape edits, industrial percussion
 Rono Tse - industrial percussion, circular saw, siren electric buzzer, tire rim, chains, whistle, oil drum, shakers, tambourines

Also
 Robert Collins - piano

Engineer
 David "Davy D" Bryson

Remix
 "Television" (Remix) remixed by Adrian Sherwood, Gary Clail and Mark Stewart

References

1988 debut albums
Alternative Tentacles albums